Parco del Valentino (also known as Valentino Park) is a popular public park  in Turin, Italy. It is located along the west bank of the Po river. It covers an area of 500,000m², which makes it Turin's second largest park (Turin's largest park, the 840,000m² Pellerina Park, is Italy's most extended urban green area).
This park has been nominated “The best Italian park” after a selection among the fifteen best Italian parks.

History
The Parco del Valentino was opened by the city of Turin in 1856, and was Italy’s first public garden.

It hosted the Eurovision Village during the Eurovision Song Contest 2022.

Racing circuit
Between 1935 and 1955 an occasional series of motorsport events were held on the roads within the park, including the 1946 Turin Grand Prix, which was the first Formula One race, and the 1948 Italian Grand Prix. These races were generally known as the Gran Premio del Valentino.

Park contents
Buildings within the park include:
The Botanical Gardens
The Baroque Castle (Castello del Valentino)
Medieval Castle and Village
The Torino Esposizioni and Underground Pavilion Complex
Società Promotrice delle Belle Arti
Villa Glicini
Enzo Ferrari's special bench

Gallery

References

Parks in Piedmont
Italian Grand Prix
Valentino
Motorsport venues in Italy
Geography of Turin
Tourist attractions in Turin
World's fair sites in Italy
Cross country running venues